Trần Thị Hoa Ry (born 11 April 1976) is a representative in the Twelfth Vietnamese National Assembly. A Buddhist and member of the Khmer ethnic minority, Hoa Ry was born in Hưng Hội village, Vĩnh Lợi District, Bạc Liêu Province. She was accepted into the Communist Party of Việt Nam on 3 March 1997, though she has still not been made an official member.

References

1976 births
Communist Party of Vietnam politicians
Khmer Krom people
Living people
Members of the National Assembly (Vietnam)
Vietnamese Buddhists
People from Bạc Liêu Province
21st-century Vietnamese women politicians
21st-century Vietnamese politicians